The Motor Lifeboat Triumph (CG 52301) was a motor lifeboat operated by the United States Coast Guard.
The Triumph, and her sister, the Invincible, were the only vessels in their class.  They were built in 1935, when the Coast Guard's other motor lifeboats were 36 foot motor lifeboat -- vessels with a shorter range, that did not need facilities for sleeping or the preparation of meals.  She could carry sixty rescued people.

Triumph was lost off the coast of Oregon in 1961. 
Five of the six sailors aboard her lost their lives.  Unlike the Triumph which was not self-righting, modern motor lifeboats are designed to be self-righting -- they mount buoyancy chambers which will rapidly force the boats right-side-up, if they overturned.

The 52-foot wooden-hulled motor lifeboats were replaced in the 1950s and 1960s by the steel-hulled 52-foot Motor Lifeboats.

References

1961 in Oregon
Ships of the United States Coast Guard
Maritime incidents in 1961
Shipwrecks of the Oregon coast
Triumph (CG 52301)